Benjamin D. Bridges Sr. (born August 30, 1940, in Ila, Madison County, Georgia) is a former Republican politician and one-time member of the Georgia House of Representatives. Bridges represented Georgia's 9th (1997-2001), then 7th (2001–2003), and then 10th (2003-2009) districts, based about the city of Cleveland, between 1997 and 2009. He was chairman of the House Retirement Committee, and was replaced as the 10th district's representative by fellow Republican Rick Austin in 2008.

Biography
Born in 1940, Bridges graduated from high school in 1959 and received a barber license in 1960. He worked as a barber for six years before joining the Georgia State Patrol in 1966. He retired in 1995 with the rank of captain, and was elected to the Georgia House of Representatives in 1997. He served in the House until 2008.

2007 anti-evolution controversy
In February 2007, Bridges was criticized by the Anti-Defamation League and others for circulating a memo condemning evolution and heliocentrism in the Georgia legislature. The memo claimed that:

The memo also directed readers to the website of the young Earth creationist Fair Education Foundation, which claims the Earth is not rotating or orbiting the Sun, and denies the existence of any stars or exoplanets outside the solar system. Marshall Hall (1931–2013), the memo's author and the founder of the Fair Education Foundation, was the husband of Bridges' longtime campaign manager, Bonnie Hall.

Bridges claimed he had nothing to do with the memo, but Hall stated that he had Bridges' approval. Bridges said he did not necessarily disagree with Hall's viewpoint; he was quoted as saying, "I agree with it more than I would the Big Bang Theory or the Darwin Theory". Bridges' memo was later circulated in the Texas legislature by the conservative Republican Warren Chisum of Pampa, the seat of Gray County in the Texas Panhandle.

References

External links
 Voting record (2006–2008) on VoteSmart
 Fair Education Foundation website

1940 births
Living people
Republican Party members of the Georgia House of Representatives
Barbers
Baptists from Georgia (U.S. state)
American creationists
People from Madison County, Georgia
People from Cleveland, Georgia
21st-century American politicians